Clark Wayne Dowd (November 1, 1941 – June 16, 2016) was an American politician and lawyer.

Born in Texarkana, Arkansas, Dowd graduated from Southern Arkansas University and University of Arkansas School of Law. Dowd practiced law in Texarkana, Arkansas. From 1978 to 2000, Dowd served in the Arkansas State Senate and was a Democrat. Dowd died in Hot Springs, Arkansas, while attending the Arkansas Bar Association annual meeting.

Notes

1941 births
2016 deaths
People from Texarkana, Arkansas
Southern Arkansas University alumni
University of Arkansas School of Law alumni
Arkansas lawyers
Democratic Party Arkansas state senators
20th-century American lawyers